William Samuel George (27 July 1895 – 29 September 1962) was an English professional footballer who played as a wing half for Sunderland.

References

1895 births
1962 deaths
Footballers from Birmingham, West Midlands
English footballers
Association football wing halves
Austin Motor Works F.C. players
Merthyr Town F.C. players
Sunderland A.F.C. players
Shildon A.F.C. players
Burton Town F.C. players
English Football League players